Karlan is a surname.   It may refer to:

 Dean Karlan, American economist, professor at Northwestern University
 Michael Karlan (b. 1968), American party planner, former attorney
 Pamela S. Karlan (b. 1959), professor of law at Stanford University
 Richard Karlan (1919-2004), American actor

Karlan is also a given name, and may refer to 
 Karlan Grant (b. 1997), English footballer

See also

Karlyn